Rice production in Indonesia is an important part of the national economy. Indonesia is the third-largest producer of rice in the world.

Rice was the staple food in the Indonesian diet, accounting for more than half of the calories in the average diet, and the source of livelihood for about 20 million households, or about 100 million people, in the late 1980s. Rice cultivation covered a total of around 10 million hectares throughout the archipelago, primarily on sawah. The supply and control of water is crucial to the productivity of rice land, especially when planted with high-yield seed varieties. In 1987 irrigated sawah covered 58 percent of the total cultivated area, rainfed sawah accounted for 20 percent, and ladang, or dryland cultivation, together with swamp or tidal cultivation covered the remaining 22 percent of rice cropland.

History

Rice is a staple food for all classes in contemporary Indonesia, and it holds the central place in Indonesian culture and Indonesian cuisine: it shapes the landscape; is sold at markets; and is served in most meals both as a savoury and a sweet food. The importance of rice in Indonesian culture is demonstrated through the reverence of Dewi Sri, the rice goddess of ancient Java and Bali. Traditionally the agricultural cycles linked to rice cultivations were celebrated through rituals, such as Sundanese Seren Taun rice harvest festival. In Bali the traditional subak irrigation management was created to ensure the water supplies for rice paddies, managed by priest and created around "water temples".

Rice is most often eaten as plain rice with just a few protein and vegetable dishes as side dishes. It is also served, however, as nasi uduk (rice cooked in coconut milk), nasi kuning (rice cooked with coconut milk and turmeric), ketupat (rice steamed in woven packets of coconut fronds), lontong (rice steamed in banana leaves), intip or rengginang (rice crackers), desserts, vermicelli, noodles, arak beras (rice wine), and nasi goreng (fried rice). Nasi goreng is omnipresent in Indonesia and considered as national dish.

Evidence of wild rice on the island of Sulawesi dates from 3000 BC. Evidence for the earliest cultivation, however, comes from eighth century stone inscriptions from the central island of Java, which show kings levied taxes in rice. The images of rice cultivation, rice barn, and mouse pest infesting a rice field is evident in Karmawibhangga bas-reliefs of Borobudur. Divisions of labour between men, women, and animals that are still in place in Indonesian rice cultivation, were carved into relief friezes on the ninth century Prambanan temples in Central Java: a water buffalo attached to a plough; women planting seedlings and pounding grain; and a man carrying sheaves of rice on each end of a pole across his shoulders (pikulan). In the sixteenth century, Europeans visiting the Indonesian islands saw rice as a new prestige food served to the aristocracy during ceremonies and feasts.

Rice production in Indonesian history is linked to the development of iron tools and the domestication of Wild Asian Water Buffalo as water buffalo for cultivation of fields and manure for fertilizer. Rice production requires exposure to the sun. Once covered in dense forest, much of the Indonesian landscape has been gradually cleared for permanent fields and settlements as rice cultivation developed over the last fifteen hundred years.

Supply and trade regulations

The government was intensely involved in the rice economy, both to stabilize prices for urban consumers and to expand domestic output to achieve national self-sufficiency in rice production. Various governmental policies included the dissemination of high-yield seed varieties through government-sponsored extension programs, direct investment in irrigation facilities, and control of the domestic price of rice through the National Logistical Supply Organization (Bulog), the government rice-trading monopoly. In the 1970s, Indonesia was a major rice importer, but by 1985 self-sufficiency had been achieved after six years of annual growth rates in excess of 7 percent per year. From 1968 to 1989, annual rice production had increased from 12 million to over 40 million tons, and yields had increased from 2.14 tons of padi (wet rice growing) per hectare to 4.23 tons per hectare.

The most significant factor in this impressive increase in output and productivity was the spread of high-yield rice varieties. By the mid-1980s, 85 percent of rice farmers used high-yielding variety seeds, compared with 50 percent in 1975. High-yield varieties were promoted together with subsidized fertilizer, pesticides, and credit through the "mass guidance" or Bimas rice intensification program. This extension program also offered technical assistance to farmers unfamiliar with the new cultivation techniques. The new technology was not without its own problems, however. Several major infestations of the brown planthopper, whose natural predators were eliminated by the heavy use of subsidized pesticides, led to a new strategy in 1988 to apply the techniques of integrated pest management, relying on a variety of methods to limit pesticide use for control insects, plant diseases and rodents. To help reduce pesticide use, subsidies on pesticides were eliminated in 1989.

Government investments in irrigation had also made a significant contribution to increased rice production in Indonesia. From FY 1969 to FY 1989, 2.5 million hectares of existing irrigated land were rehabilitated, and irrigation was expanded to cover about 1.2 million hectares.

Because the government objective of price stability for urban consumers could potentially undermine efforts to increase production by reducing the profitability of the rice crop, Bulog's operations evolved to take into consideration producer incentives as well as consumer costs. Domestic rice prices were permitted to rise gradually during the 1970s, although they were generally held below world rice prices. However, domestic prices were kept above world prices in several periods during the 1980s. Bulog influenced the domestic rice price by operating a buffer stock on the order of 2 million tons during the 1980s. When domestic prices fell, Bulog purchased rice through village cooperatives, and when prices rose above the price ceiling, Bulog released buffer supplies. The margin between the producer floor price and urban ceiling price was sufficient to permit private traders to operate profitably, and Bulog's distribution of rice was limited to under 15 percent of total rice consumed domestically in a given year.

References

Agriculture in Indonesia
Indonesia